Palmicellaria elegans is a species of marine bryozoans in the family Celleporidae.

References 

 Palmicellaria elegans at WoRMS

Cheilostomatida
Animals described in 1864